The Verse of Evil Eye is verse 51 and 52 of Al-Qalam (Q68:51-52) in the Quran. It is usually recited for protection from the evil eye. It states: "And indeed, those who disbelieve would almost make you slip with their eyes when they hear the message, and they say: Indeed, he is mad. But it is not except a reminder to the worlds (68:51 and 52)."

The context of the verse  

Verse 51: And indeed, those who disbelieve would almost make you slip with their eyes when they hear the message, and they say, "Indeed, he is mad."  

Verse 52: But it is not except a reminder to the worlds.

Exegesis 
The verse refers to an evil eye. This meant that they want to make Muhammad sick and die with a special kind of look. It also suggests that the verse is a metonymy for 'very angry glances', as they looked very furiously as if they wanted to kill Muhammad. In addition, the grudges of the disbelievers led them to a contradiction. On the one hand, they understood the importance of the Quran insofar as they desired the destruction of the Islamic Prophet, but on the other hand, they accuse him of madness.

See also 
 Verse of Ikmal al-Din
 Verse of Loan
 Verse of Wilayah
 Warning Verse
 Verse of Brotherhood
 Verse of Purification
 People of Ditch
 Muhammad in the Quran
 Obedience Verse
 Verse of Mawadda

References 

Quranic verses
Muhammad